Timothy Donald Bower (born 10 September 1968 in Devonport, Tasmania) was an Australian cricketer who played for Tasmania.

See also
 List of Tasmanian representative cricketers

External links
 

1968 births
Living people
Australian cricketers
Tasmania cricketers
People from Devonport, Tasmania
Cricketers from Tasmania